Semyonovka is the name of several rural localities in Russia.

Modern localities

Altai Krai
As of 2014, four rural localities in Altai Krai bear this name:

Semyonovka, Slavgorod, Altai Krai, a selo under the administrative jurisdiction of the town of krai significance of Slavgorod; 
Semyonovka, Krasnoshchyokovsky District, Altai Krai, a settlement in Krasnoshchekovsky Selsoviet of Krasnoshchyokovsky District; 
Semyonovka, Kulundinsky District, Altai Krai, a selo in Semyonovsky Selsoviet of Kulundinsky District; 
Semyonovka, Tretyakovsky District, Altai Krai, a settlement in Shipunikhinsky Selsoviet of Tretyakovsky District;

Amur Oblast
As of 2014, two rural localities in Amur Oblast bear this name:

Semyonovka, Bureysky District, Amur Oblast, a selo in Rodionovsky Rural Settlement of Bureysky District; 
Semyonovka, Svobodnensky District, Amur Oblast, a selo in Semyonovsky Rural Settlement of Svobodnensky District;

Republic of Bashkortostan
As of 2014, two rural localities in the Republic of Bashkortostan bear this name:

Semyonovka, Chishminsky District, Republic of Bashkortostan, a village in Yengalyshevsky Selsoviet of Chishminsky District; 
Semyonovka, Meleuzovsky District, Republic of Bashkortostan, a village in Zirgansky Selsoviet of Meleuzovsky District;

Belgorod Oblast
As of 2014, one rural locality in Belgorod Oblast bears this name:

Semyonovka, Belgorod Oblast, a selo in Novooskolsky District;

Bryansk Oblast
As of 2014, five rural localities in Bryansk Oblast bear this name:

Semyonovka, Karachevsky District, Bryansk Oblast, a village in Dronovsky Rural Administrative Okrug of Karachevsky District; 
Semyonovka, Mglinsky District, Bryansk Oblast, a settlement in Belovodsky Rural Administrative Okrug of Mglinsky District; 
Semyonovka, Rognedinsky District, Bryansk Oblast, a village in Voronovsky Rural Administrative Okrug of Rognedinsky District; 
Semyonovka, Sevsky District, Bryansk Oblast, a village in Novoyamsky Rural Administrative Okrug of Sevsky District; 
Semyonovka, Vygonichsky District, Bryansk Oblast, a settlement in Ormensky Rural Administrative Okrug of Vygonichsky District;

Republic of Buryatia
As of 2014, one rural locality in the Republic of Buryatia bears this name:

Semyonovka, Republic of Buryatia, a selo in Kudarinsky Somon of Kyakhtinsky District;

Chelyabinsk Oblast
As of 2014, one rural locality in Chelyabinsk Oblast bears this name:

Semyonovka, Chelyabinsk Oblast, a village in Oktyabrsky Selsoviet of Oktyabrsky District;

Chuvash Republic
As of 2014, one rural locality in the Chuvash Republic bears this name:

Semyonovka, Chuvash Republic, a village in Askhvinskoye Rural Settlement of Kanashsky District;

Republic of Crimea
As of 2014, one rural locality in the Republic of Crimea bears this name:
Semyonovka, Republic of Crimea, a selo in Leninsky District

Kaluga Oblast
As of 2014, one rural locality in Kaluga Oblast bears this name:
Semyonovka, Kaluga Oblast, a selo in Peremyshlsky District

Krasnodar Krai
As of 2014, three rural localities in Krasnodar Krai bear this name:

Semyonovka, Sochi, Krasnodar Krai, a selo in Razdolsky Rural Okrug under the administrative jurisdiction of Khostinsky City District of the City of Sochi; 
Semyonovka, Kushchyovsky District, Krasnodar Krai, a khutor in Razdolnensky Rural Okrug of Kushchyovsky District; 
Semyonovka, Ust-Labinsky District, Krasnodar Krai, a khutor in Alexandrovsky Rural Okrug of Ust-Labinsky District;

Krasnoyarsk Krai
As of 2014, two rural localities in Krasnoyarsk Krai bear this name:
Semyonovka, Dzerzhinsky District, Krasnoyarsk Krai, a village in Nizhnetanaysky Selsoviet of Dzerzhinsky District
Semyonovka, Uyarsky District, Krasnoyarsk Krai, a village in Sushinovsky Selsoviet of Uyarsky District

Kursk Oblast
As of 2014, ten rural localities in Kursk Oblast bear this name:
Semyonovka, Kastorensky District, Kursk Oblast, a selo in Semyonovsky Selsoviet of Kastorensky District
Semyonovka, Konyshyovsky District, Kursk Oblast, a village in Platavsky Selsoviet of Konyshyovsky District
Semyonovka, Lebyazhensky Selsoviet, Kursky District, Kursk Oblast, a village in Lebyazhensky Selsoviet of Kursky District
Semyonovka, Shchetinsky Selsoviet, Kursky District, Kursk Oblast, a village in Shchetinsky Selsoviet of Kursky District
Semyonovka, Lgovsky District, Kursk Oblast, a village in Krombykovsky Selsoviet of Lgovsky District
Semyonovka, Oboyansky District, Kursk Oblast, a selo in Zorinsky Selsoviet of Oboyansky District
Semyonovka, Shchigrovsky District, Kursk Oblast, a village in Vishnevsky Selsoviet of Shchigrovsky District
Semyonovka, Shumakovsky Selsoviet, Solntsevsky District, Kursk Oblast, a village in Shumakovsky Selsoviet of Solntsevsky District
Semyonovka, Vorobyevsky Selsoviet, Solntsevsky District, Kursk Oblast, a village in Vorobyevsky Selsoviet of Solntsevsky District
Semyonovka, Sudzhansky District, Kursk Oblast, a village in Vorobzhansky Selsoviet of Sudzhansky District

Lipetsk Oblast
As of 2014, two rural localities in Lipetsk Oblast bear this name:

Semyonovka, Volovsky District, Lipetsk Oblast, a village in Naberezhansky Selsoviet of Volovsky District; 
Semyonovka, Zadonsky District, Lipetsk Oblast, a village in Kalabinsky Selsoviet of Zadonsky District;

Mari El Republic
As of 2014, four rural localities in the Mari El Republic bear this name:

Semyonovka, Yoshkar-Ola, Mari El Republic, a selo under the administrative jurisdiction of the city of republic significance of Yoshkar-Ola; 
Semyonovka, Mari-Tureksky District, Mari El Republic, a village in Khlebnikovsky Rural Okrug of Mari-Tureksky District; 
Semyonovka, Sovetsky District, Mari El Republic, a village in Mikhaylovsky Rural Okrug of Sovetsky District; 
Semyonovka, Zvenigovsky District, Mari El Republic, a village in Kokshaysky Rural Okrug of Zvenigovsky District;

Republic of Mordovia
As of 2014, four rural localities in the Republic of Mordovia bear this name:

Semyonovka, Chamzinsky District, Republic of Mordovia, a village in Apraksinsky Selsoviet of Chamzinsky District; 
Semyonovka, Insarsky District, Republic of Mordovia, a village in Yazykovo-Pyatinsky Selsoviet of Insarsky District; 
Semyonovka, Temnikovsky District, Republic of Mordovia, a settlement in Alexeyevsky Selsoviet of Temnikovsky District; 
Semyonovka, Torbeyevsky District, Republic of Mordovia, a village in Mordovsko-Yunkinsky Selsoviet of Torbeyevsky District;

Nizhny Novgorod Oblast
As of 2014, one rural locality in Nizhny Novgorod Oblast bears this name:

Semyonovka, Nizhny Novgorod Oblast, a selo in Semyonovsky Selsoviet of Krasnooktyabrsky District;

Omsk Oblast
As of 2014, two rural localities in Omsk Oblast bear this name:

Semyonovka, Kalachinsky District, Omsk Oblast, a village in Velikorussky Rural Okrug of Kalachinsky District; 
Semyonovka, Znamensky District, Omsk Oblast, a selo in Semyonovsky Rural Okrug of Znamensky District;

Orenburg Oblast
As of 2014, two rural localities in Orenburg Oblast bear this name:
Semyonovka, Kurmanayevsky District, Orenburg Oblast, a selo in Volzhsky Selsoviet of Kurmanayevsky District
Semyonovka, Ponomaryovsky District, Orenburg Oblast, a selo in Semyonovsky Selsoviet of Ponomaryovsky District

Oryol Oblast
As of 2014, three rural localities in Oryol Oblast bear this name:

Semyonovka, Maloarkhangelsky District, Oryol Oblast, a village in Podgorodnensky Selsoviet of Maloarkhangelsky District; 
Semyonovka, Shablykinsky District, Oryol Oblast, a selo in Khotkovsky Selsoviet of Shablykinsky District; 
Semyonovka, Verkhovsky District, Oryol Oblast, a village in Galichinsky Selsoviet of Verkhovsky District;

Pskov Oblast
As of 2014, one rural locality in Pskov Oblast bears this name:
Semyonovka, Pskov Oblast, a village in Nevelsky District

Rostov Oblast
As of 2014, three rural localities in Rostov Oblast bear this name:

Semyonovka, Kasharsky District, Rostov Oblast, a khutor in Popovskoye Rural Settlement of Kasharsky District; 
Semyonovka, Milyutinsky District, Rostov Oblast, a khutor in Mankovo-Berezovskoye Rural Settlement of Milyutinsky District; 
Semyonovka, Morozovsky District, Rostov Oblast, a khutor in Volno-Donskoye Rural Settlement of Morozovsky District;

Ryazan Oblast
As of 2014, one rural locality in Ryazan Oblast bears this name:
Semyonovka, Ryazan Oblast, a village under the administrative jurisdiction of Kadom Work Settlement in Kadomsky District

Samara Oblast
As of 2014, three rural localities in Samara Oblast bear this name:
Semyonovka, Novokuybyshevsk, Samara Oblast, a settlement under the administrative jurisdiction of the city of oblast significance of Novokuybyshevsk
Semyonovka, Kinel-Cherkassky District, Samara Oblast, a selo in Kinel-Cherkassky District
Semyonovka, Neftegorsky District, Samara Oblast, a selo in Neftegorsky District

Saratov Oblast
As of 2014, four rural localities in Saratov Oblast bear this name:
Semyonovka, Arkadaksky District, Saratov Oblast, a selo in Arkadaksky District
Semyonovka, Fyodorovsky District, Saratov Oblast, a selo in Fyodorovsky District
Semyonovka, Krasnopartizansky District, Saratov Oblast, a selo in Krasnopartizansky District
Semyonovka, Marksovsky District, Saratov Oblast, a selo in Marksovsky District

Smolensk Oblast
As of 2014, three rural localities in Smolensk Oblast bear this name:
Semyonovka, Demidovsky District, Smolensk Oblast, a village in Titovshchinskoye Rural Settlement of Demidovsky District
Semyonovka, Roslavlsky District, Smolensk Oblast, a village in Lyubovskoye Rural Settlement of Roslavlsky District
Semyonovka, Yershichsky District, Smolensk Oblast, a village in Rukhanskoye Rural Settlement of Yershichsky District

Stavropol Krai
As of 2014, one rural locality in Stavropol Krai bears this name:
Semyonovka, Stavropol Krai, a settlement in Shaumyanovsky Selsoviet of Georgiyevsky District

Tambov Oblast
As of 2014, four rural localities in Tambov Oblast bear this name:
Semyonovka, Inzhavinsky District, Tambov Oblast, a selo in Nikitinsky Selsoviet of Inzhavinsky District
Semyonovka, Petrovsky District, Tambov Oblast, a selo in Petrovsky Selsoviet of Petrovsky District
Semyonovka, Rzhaksinsky District, Tambov Oblast, a selo in Bolsherzhaksinsky Selsoviet of Rzhaksinsky District
Semyonovka, Tokaryovsky District, Tambov Oblast, a selo in Abakumovsky Selsoviet of Tokaryovsky District

Tomsk Oblast
As of 2014, one rural locality in Tomsk Oblast bears this name:
Semyonovka, Tomsk Oblast, a selo in Zyryansky District

Tula Oblast
As of 2014, three rural localities in Tula Oblast bear this name:
Semyonovka, Dubensky District, Tula Oblast, a village in Gvardeysky Rural Okrug of Dubensky District
Semyonovka, Leninsky District, Tula Oblast, a village in Rozhdestvensky Rural Okrug of Leninsky District
Semyonovka, Volovsky District, Tula Oblast, a village in Baskakovsky Rural Okrug of Volovsky District

Ulyanovsk Oblast
As of 2014, one rural locality in Ulyanovsk Oblast bears this name:
Semyonovka, Ulyanovsk Oblast, a village in Timiryazevsky Rural Okrug of Ulyanovsky District

Vladimir Oblast
As of 2014, two rural localities in Vladimir Oblast bear this name:
Semyonovka, Gorokhovetsky District, Vladimir Oblast, a village in Gorokhovetsky District
Semyonovka, Gus-Khrustalny District, Vladimir Oblast, a village in Gus-Khrustalny District

Volgograd Oblast
As of 2014, three rural localities in Volgograd Oblast bear this name:
Semyonovka, Dubovsky District, Volgograd Oblast, a selo in Ust-Pogozhinsky Selsoviet of Dubovsky District
Semyonovka, Kamyshinsky District, Volgograd Oblast, a selo in Semyonovsky Selsoviet of Kamyshinsky District
Semyonovka, Kikvidzensky District, Volgograd Oblast, a selo in Semyonovsky Selsoviet of Kikvidzensky District

Voronezh Oblast
As of 2014, two rural localities in Voronezh Oblast bear this name:
Semyonovka, Kalacheyevsky District, Voronezh Oblast, a selo in Semyonovskoye Rural Settlement of Kalacheyevsky District
Semyonovka, Verkhnekhavsky District, Voronezh Oblast, a selo in Semyonovskoye Rural Settlement of Verkhnekhavsky District

Yaroslavl Oblast
As of 2014, two rural localities in Yaroslavl Oblast bear this name:
Semyonovka, Breytovsky District, Yaroslavl Oblast, a village in Ulyanovsky Rural Okrug of Breytovsky District
Semyonovka, Pereslavsky District, Yaroslavl Oblast, a village in Aleksinsky Rural Okrug of Pereslavsky District

Alternative names
Semyonovka, alternative name of Semenovo, a village in Kenozersky Selsoviet of Plesetsky District in Arkhangelsk Oblast; 
Semyonovka, alternative name of Pribrezhny, a settlement in Zamyansky Selsoviet of Yenotayevsky District in Astrakhan Oblast; 
Semyonovka, alternative name of Semenkino, a selo in Semenkinsky Selsoviet of Aurgazinsky District in the Republic of Bashkortostan; 
Semyonovka, alternative name of Plekhanovo, a selo in Plekhanovsky Selsoviet of Gryazinsky District in Lipetsk Oblast; 
Semyonovka, alternative name of Semyanovka, a village in Loginovsky Rural Okrug of Pavlogradsky District in Omsk Oblast;

Historical names
Semyonovka, name of the town of Arsenyev in Primorsky Krai from 1895 to 1952

Notes